During the 1936–1939 Arab revolt in Palestine against the Mandatory Palestine, the militant Zionist group Irgun carried out 60 attacks against Palestinian people and the British Army. Irgun was described as a terrorist organization by The New York Times, the Anglo-American Committee of Enquiry, prominent world figures such as Winston Churchill and Jewish figures such as Hannah Arendt, Albert Einstein, and many others.  The Israeli Ministry of Foreign Affairs describes it as "an underground organization." The New York Times at the time cited sources in an investigative piece which linked the Haganah paramilitary group to Irgun attacks such as the King David Hotel bombing.

Irgun launched a series of attacks which lasted until the founding of Israel. All told, Irgun attacks against Arab targets resulted in at least 250 Arab deaths during this period. The following is a list of attacks resulting in death attributed to Irgun that took place during the 1930s and 1940s. Irgun conducted at least 60 operations altogether during this period.

During the Arab revolt (1937–1939)

During the Jewish insurgency (1944–1947)

During the Civil War (1947–48)

See also
 List of Irgun members
 List of killings and massacres in Mandatory Palestine

References

External links
Palestine Post Archive
 Arie Perliger and Leonard Weinberg, Jewish Self Defense and Terrorist Groups Prior to the Establishment of the State of Israel: Roots and Traditions. Totalitarian Movements & Political Religions, Vol. 4, No. 3 (2003) 91-118. Online version

Irgun
Terrorist incidents in the 1930s
Terrorist incidents in Asia in the 1940s
Zionist terrorism
Terrorism in Mandatory Palestine
Mandatory Palestine in World War II